Alexandra Duah (died 2000) was a Ghanaian veteran actress who contributed to the growth of the Ghanaian movie industry.

Education 
She was trained in cinematography and qualified as a film editor and had training from an old actress named Jean P. Martin in London to improve her skills.

Filmography 
List of movies over the years.

 Matters of The Heart
 Sankofa (film)
 
 Ama
 Heritage Africa

References 

20th-century Ghanaian actresses
Year of birth missing
2000 deaths